The Ashridge Dining Club was a political club set up in 1933 in West London with the object of extending the associations and activities of the Bonar Law College, Ashridge, by discussion over the dinner table. The Bonar Law College had been opened in 1929 by Stanley Baldwin having been presented to the Conservative Party by Mr Urban Broughton as a training college for Conservative workers. It was named as a memorial to Bonar Law, the British Conservative Party politician and Prime Minister, who had died in 1923. The aim of the College was to provide political education and was not explicitly Conservative.

Associated with the College were regional or county circles or clubs; their activities were reported by The Ashridge Journal.

Ordinary membership was open to those who had attended courses at Ashridge, with others being associate members. Membership was by subscription. Meetings took place at York Mansions Restaurant, Petty France, London. The president of the club was Mr Arthur Bryant, editor of the Ashridge Journal and author of "The Spirit of Conservatism"; the founder and chairman was Miss Sheelagh Dumay Kerr.

Other members of the committee were:

Vice-Presidents 
Mr L H Sutton, 
Mr T N Graham, The Principal of Ashridge.

Hon. Secretary 
Miss E M Soutter

Hon Treasurer 
Lt. Col. A. H. Burne, D.S.O.

The speakers and subjects discussed by the dining club illustrate some of the political concerns at that time. Meetings continued until the outbreak of the Second World War.

In London there was also the London Ashridge Circle, which arranged dinners at St Ermin's Hotel, Caxton Street, Westminster, and the London Ashridge Club.

Following the fiftieth dinner in 1938 a review of the club was included in the Ashridge Journal on the occasion of Miss Kerr resigning as chairman and Mr W R C Snape taking over.

Meetings

References

1933 establishments in England
1938 disestablishments in England
Organizations established in 1933
Organizations disestablished in 1938
Conservative organisations in the United Kingdom
Clubs and societies in London